Franck Riboud (born 7 November 1955) is a French businessman. He served as the chairman of Danone.

Biography
Franck Riboud was born on 7 November 1955 in Lyon. He is the son of Antoine Riboud, the previous CEO, who transformed the former European glassmaker BSN Group into a leading player in the food industry. He attended the Lycée Ampère in Lyon, and the École Polytechnique Fédérale de Lausanne in Switzerland.

Riboud took over the reins at Danone from his father in 1996, although his family only spoke for 1% of Danone's share capital at the time. On 1 October 2014, he was succeeded by Emmanuel Faber as the CEO of Danone.

He is on the board of directors for Renault SA. He also sits on the board of directors of the Consumer Goods Forum. He is member of IESE's International Advisory Board (IAB).

See also
Danone

References

External links 
Summary official bio

1955 births
Living people
Businesspeople from Lyon
Renault people
École Polytechnique Fédérale de Lausanne alumni
Groupe Danone people
French chairpersons of corporations
French chief executives